Phricodoceras is an extinct genus of cephalopod belonging to the Ammonite subclass.

Distribution
Austria, Canada, Hungary, Morocco, Turkey and the United Kingdom.

References

Ammonitida genera
Eoderoceratoidea
Early Jurassic ammonites of Europe
Ammonites of Europe
Pliensbachian life